Vita Rudenok also written as Victoria Roudenok (original name: Віта Руденок, born ) is a Ukrainian female weightlifter, competing in the +75 kg category and representing Ukraine at international competitions. 

She participated at the 2000 Summer Olympics in the +75 kg event. 
She competed at world championships, most recently at the 1999 World Weightlifting Championships.

Major results

References

External links
 

1978 births
Living people
Ukrainian female weightlifters
Weightlifters at the 2000 Summer Olympics
Olympic weightlifters of Ukraine
Place of birth missing (living people)
20th-century Ukrainian women
21st-century Ukrainian women